Petronilla is a Late Latin feminine given name. The name is a diminutive form of Petronia, itself the feminine form of Petronius, a Roman family name. Saint Petronilla is an early Roman saint, later interpreted as the daughter of Saint Peter. She became the patron saint of the Frankish kings, and her chapel became the burial place for French kings. 
The derived form Petronella, later changed to Pieternella, has been popular in the Netherlands since the Middle Ages, perhaps due to Gertrude, Countess of Holland, adopting this name around 1100. In daily life, many people with this given name use a short form, like Petra, Nel, Nelleke, Nelly, Ella, Ellen, and Elly.

People called Petronilla:
Saint Petronilla, venerated by the 4th century
Petronilla (9th century), daughter of Hugh, son of Charlemagne, and mother of Ingelger of Anjou
Petronilla of Lorraine (c. 1082 – 1144), Countess of Holland
Petronilla of Aragon (died 1173)
Petronilla of Aquitaine (died before 1152)
Petronilla, Countess of Bigorre (c. 1184 – 1251)
Petronilla de Meath (died 1324), Irish maidservant executed for heresy

People called Petronella:
Petronella of Coutrai (fl. 1200–1214), regent of Flanders
Petronella Barker (actress, born 1942), British actress
Petronella Barker (actress, born 1965), British-born Norwegian actress
Petronella J.M.G. "Elly" Blanksma-van den Heuvel (born 1959), Dutch politician and banker
Petronella T.M. "Ellen" Bontje (born 1958), Dutch equestrian
Petronella Bos (born 1947), Dutch swimmer
Petronella "Nel" Büch (1931–2013), Dutch sprinter
Petronella Burgerhof (1908–1991), Dutch gymnast and Olympic gold medallist
Petronella de la Court (1624–1707), Dutch art collector
Auguste van Pels (1900–1945), called Petronella van Daan in Anne Frank's diary
Petronella Duncan, South African politician and Member of Parliament with the Democratic Alliance
Petronella Dunois (1650–1695), Dutch art collector
Petronella Ekroth (born 1989), Swedish footballer
Petronella F.C. "Nel" Garritsen (1933–2014), Dutch swimmer
Petronella Huybrechtse (born 1972), Dutch sprinter
Petronella de Jong (born 1970), Dutch Olympic sailor
Petronella Moens (1762–1843), Dutch writer, editor and feminist
Petronella Muns (1794–1842), Dutch servant, one of the first Western women in Japan
Petronella Oortman (1656–1716), Dutch art collector
Petronella W.C. "Nelleke" Penninx (born 1971), Dutch rower
Pieternella C. "Elly" Plooij-van Gorsel (born 1947), Dutch Member of the European Parliament
Petronella van Randwijk (1905–1978), Dutch gymnast
Petronella J. "Nelly" de Rooij (1883–1964), Dutch zoologist and herpetologist
Petronella G. "Nel" Roos-Lodder (1914–1996), Dutch discus thrower
Petronella Melusine von der Schulenburg (1693–1778), Countess of Walsingham
Petra van Staveren (born 1966), Dutch swimmer
Petronella Tshuma (born 1990), South African actress
Petronella van Vliet (1926–2006), Dutch swimmer
Petronella van Woensel (1785–1839), Dutch painter
Petronella Wyatt (born 1968), British journalist and author
Petronella Zwier (1936–2001), Dutch high jumper

Fictional characters
Petronella Osgood, a Doctor Who character

References

Dutch feminine given names